Glenwood Springs High School is a high school in Glenwood Springs, Colorado, United States. It is a member of Roaring Fork School District Re-1 in Carbondale.

References

External links

Educational institutions in the United States with year of establishment missing
Glenwood Springs, Colorado
Public high schools in Colorado
Schools in Garfield County, Colorado